The messiah in Judaism means "anointed one" and included Jewish priests, prophets and kings such as David and Cyrus the Great. Later, especially after the failure of the Hasmonean Kingdom (37 BCE) and the Jewish–Roman wars (66–135 CE), the figure of the Jewish messiah was one who would deliver the Jews from oppression and usher in an Olam HaBa ("world to come") or Messianic Age.

Some people were looking forward to a military leader who would defeat the Seleucid or Roman enemies and establish an independent Jewish kingdom. Others, like the author of the Psalms of Solomon, stated that the messiah was a charismatic teacher who would give the correct interpretation of Mosaic law, restore Israel, and judge mankind.

This is a list of notable people who have been said to be the messiah ben David, either by themselves or by their followers. The list is divided into categories, which are sorted according to date of birth (where known).

1st century
Jesus of Nazareth (ca. 4 BC–30/33 AD), in Galilee and the Roman province of Judea. Jews who believed him to be the Messiah were the first Christians, also known as Jewish Christians. As of 2015, it is estimated that there are 2.3 billion Christians in the world, making Jesus of Nazareth the most widely followed and most famous Messiah claimant. Muslims also believe that Jesus was the Messiah but not the Son of God. Aside from the New Testament, Jesus of Nazareth is mentioned by Josephus in the Antiquities of the Jews and by Tacitus in his Annals.
 Several military leaders lived in the 1st century, including Judas of Galilee, Theudas, Simon of Peraea, and Athronges, all of whom are only documented by Josephus in surviving accounts. None of them was explicitly stated to have been thought of as a Messiah but some scholars make this as an inference.

2nd century
With the destruction of the Temple in Jerusalem, the appearance of messiahs ceased for a time. Sixty years later a politico-Messianic movement of large proportions took place.
 Simon bar Kokhba (also: Bar Kosiba) (?– died c. 135), led a revolt against Rome circa 132–135 CE. Bar Kokhba was hailed as Messiah-king by Rabbi Akiva, who referred to him using Numbers xxiv. 17: "There shall come forth a star out of Jacob, and a sceptre shall rise out of Israel, and shall smite through the corners of Moab," and Hag. ii. 21, 22: "I will shake the heavens and the earth and I will overthrow the thrones of kingdoms...." (Talmud tractate Sanhedrin 97b). His messiahship was doubted by some, but bar Kokhba led a rebellion and founded a short-lived Jewish state. He was killed in the siege of Betar, which was the final battle of the Third Jewish–Roman War that devastated Judea.

5th century
 Moses of Crete. The unsuccessful conclusion of the Bar Kokhba war put an end for a while to messianic movements, but messianic hopes were nonetheless cherished. In accordance with computations found in the Talmud, the Messiah was expected to appear in the years 440 (Sanh. 97b) or 471 ('Ab. Zarah 9b). This expectation in connection with the disturbances in the Roman empire attendant upon invasions may have raised up hopes of the Messiah. Moses of Crete appeared about this time and won over many Jews to his movement. He promised to lead the people, like the ancient Moses, dry-shod through the sea back to Israel. In about 440–470, his followers, convinced by him, left their possessions and waited for the promised day, when at his command many cast themselves into the sea to return to Israel, many found death while others were rescued. The putative Messiah himself disappeared. Socrates of Constantinople states that Moses of Crete fled, while the Chronicle of John of Nikiû claims that he perished in the sea. While he called himself Moses, the Chronicle gives his actual name as 'Fiskis'.

7th century
The Khuzestan Chronicle records an otherwise-unknown messianic claimant who arose alongside the Muslim conquest of Khuzestan. This Messiah led the Jews in destroying numerous Christian churches in Iraq and coastal Iran.

8th century
The claimants that followed played their roles in the Orient, and were at the same time religious reformers whose work influenced Karaism. Appearing at the first part of the 8th century in Persia:
 Isḥaḳ ben Ya'ḳub Obadiah Abu 'Isa al-Isfahani of Ispahan. He lived in the reign of Marwan II (744–750). Known as Abu Isa, he claimed to be the last of the five forerunners of the Messiah and that God had chosen him to free Israel. Having gathered a large number of followers he rebelled against the caliph in Persia. He was defeated and killed at Rai. His followers claimed that he was inspired, offering as proof the fact that he wrote books - even though he was illiterate. He founded the first sect that arose in Judaism after the destruction of the Temple, the 'Isawiyya.
 Yudghan, called "Al-Ra'i" ("the shepherd of the flock of his people"), who lived and taught in Persia in the first half of the 8th century. He was disciple of Abu Isa who continued the faith after Isa was slain.. He declared himself to be a prophet, and was regarded by his disciples as the Messiah. He came from Hamadan, and taught doctrines he claimed to have received through prophecy. According to Shahristani, he opposed anthropomorphism, taught the doctrine of free will, and held that the Torah had an allegorical meaning in addition to its literal one. He admonished his followers to lead an ascetic life, to abstain from meat and wine, and to pray and fast often, following in this his master Abu 'Isa. He held that the observance of the Sabbath and festivals was merely a matter of memorial. After his death his followers formed a sect, the Yudghanites, who believed he had not died but would return at a future date.
 Serene (his name is given variously in the sources as Sherini, Sheria, Serenus, Zonoria, Saüra, Severus) the Syrian was born a Christian. He preached in the district of Mardin between 720 and 723. Those Christian sources dependent on Theophilus's history report that "Severus" proclaimed himself Messiah; the Zuqnin Chronicle reports that he proclaimed himself Moses "sent again for the salvation of Israel". Serene promised "to lead you into the desert in order to introduce you then to the inheritance of the Promised Land which you shall possess as before"; more as a "prophet like Moses" than as a Davidic "anointed one" as such. The immediate occasion for his appearance may have been the restriction of the liberties of the Jews by the caliph Omar II (717–720) and his proselytizing efforts. Serene had followers even in Spain, where the Jews were suffering under the oppressive taxation of the new Arab rulers they had enthusiastically welcomed, and many left their homes for the new Moses. These Jews paid instead a tithe to Serene. Like Abu 'Isa and Yudghan, Serene also was a religious reformer. According to Natronai b. Nehemiah, gaon of Pumbedita (719–730), Serene was hostile to rabbinic Judaism laws. His followers disregarded the dietary laws, the rabbinically instituted prayers, and the prohibition against the "wine of libation"; they worked on the second day of the festivals; they did not write marriage and divorce documents according to Talmudic prescriptions, and did not accept the Talmudic prohibition against the marriage of near relatives. Serene was arrested. Brought before Caliph Yazid II, he declared that he had acted only in jest, whereupon he was handed over to the Jews for punishment. Natronai laid down the criteria by which Serene's followers might rejoin the synagogue; most of said followers then presumably did so.

12th century
Under the influence of the Crusades the number of Messiahs increased, and the 12th century records many of them;
 One appeared in France (c. 1087) and was slain by the French.
 Another appeared in the province of Córdoba (c. 1117).
 Moses al-Dar'i, a Moroccan teacher, gained a large following. He was convinced that the Messiah would free the Jews in the Almoravid countries at Passover 1127.
 David Alroy or Alrui, who was born in Amadiya, appeared in Persia about 1160 declaring himself a Messiah. Taking advantage of his personal popularity, the disturbed and weakened condition of the caliphate, and the discontent of the Jews, who were burdened with a heavy poll tax, he set out upon his political schemes, asserting that he had been sent by God to free the Jews from the Muslim yoke and to lead them back to Jerusalem. For this purpose he summoned the warlike Jews of northern Persia and his coreligionists of Mosul and Baghdad to come armed to his aid and to assist in the capture of Amadia. From this point his career is enveloped in legend. His movement failed, and he is said to have been assassinated, while asleep, by his father-in-law. A heavy fine was exacted from the Jews for this uprising. Alroy had many followers in Khoy, Salmas, Tabriz, and Maragheh, and after his death, these formed a sect called the Menahemists, from the Messianic name "Menahem," assumed by their founder. Benjamin Disraeli wrote the novel Alroy based on Alroy's life.
 The Yemenite Messiah, was an anonymous alleged forerunner of the Messiah from Yemen, who appeared in Fez. The Muslims were making determined efforts to convert the Jews living there. He declared the misfortunes of the time to be prognostications of the coming Messianic kingdom, and called upon the Jews to divide their property with the poor, preaching repentance that those who gave their worldly possessions to the poor would gain a treasure in heaven. This anonymous Messiah candidate was the subject of Maimonides' Iggeret Teman. He continued his activity for a year, when he was arrested by the Muslim authorities and beheaded at his own suggestion, it is said, in order that he might prove the truth of his mission by returning to life. Nothing is known beyond the mention of him in Maimonides' "Iggeret Teman" (The Yemen Epistle).

13th century

 Abraham ben Samuel Abulafia (b. 1240–after 1291), the Kabbalist, began the series of putative Messiahs whose activity is deeply influenced by their Kabbalistic speculations. Because of his mystic studies, Abulafia came to believe first that he was a prophet; and in a prophetic book, which he published in Urbino (1279), he declared that God had spoken to him. It is thought, though not proven, that in Messina, on the island of Sicily, where he was well received, and won disciples, he declared himself the Messiah and announced 1290 as the year for the Messianic era to begin. Solomon ben Adret, who was appealed to with regard to Abulafia's claims, condemned him, and some congregations declared against him. Persecuted in Sicily, he went to the island of Comino, near Malta (c. 1288), still asserting in his writings his mission. His end is unknown. Two of his disciples, Joseph Gikatilla and Samuel, both from Medinaceli, later claimed to be prophets and miracle-workers. The latter foretold in mystic language at Ayllon in Segovia the advent of the Messiah. Abulafia gained much modern notoriety as the name for the computer of a character in Umberto Eco's novel Foucault's Pendulum.
 Nissim ben Abraham (?), another individual making claims of prophethood, active in Avila around 1295. His followers told of him that, although ignorant, he had been suddenly endowed by an angel with the power to write a mystic work, The Wonder of Wisdom, with a commentary thereon. Again an appeal was made to Solomon ben Adret, who doubted Nissim's prophetic pretension and urged careful investigation. The prophet continued his activity, nevertheless, and even fixed the last day of the fourth month, Tammuz, 1295, as the date for the Messiah's coming. The credulous prepared for the event by fasting and almsgiving, and came together on the appointed day. Instead of finding the Messiah, some saw on their garments little crosses, perhaps pinned on by unbelievers to ridicule the movement. In their disappointment some of Nissim's followers are said to have gone over to Christianity.

15th century

 Moses Botarel of Cisneros (?), active around 1413. After the lapse of a century another claimant came forward with Messianic pretensions. According to H. Grätz (l.c. viii. 404), identified as Moses Botarel. He claimed to be a sorcerer able to combine the names of God.

16th century
 Asher Lammlein, Asher Kay (Käei) (?), a German proclaiming himself a forerunner of the Messiah, appeared in Istria, near Venice in 1502, and announced that if the Jews would be penitent and practice charity the Messiah would come within half a year, and a pillar of cloud and of smoke would precede the Jews on their return to Jerusalem. He found believers in Italy and Germany, even among some Christians. In obedience to his preaching, people fasted and prayed and gave alms to prepare for the coming of the Messiah, so that the year came to be known as the "year of penitence." However, by the end of the year of penitence Lammlein had either died or disappeared.
 David Reubeni (1490–1541?) and Solomon Molcho (1500–1532) was an adventurer who travelled in Portugal, Italy, and Turkey. He pretended to be the ambassador and brother of the King of Khaibar, a town and former district of Arabia, in which the descendants of the "lost tribes" of Reuben and Gad were supposed to dwell. He claimed he was sent to the Pope and the powers of Europe to secure cannon and firearms for war against the Muslims, who prevented the union of the Jews living on the two sides of the Red Sea. He denied expressly that he was a Messiah or a prophet (comp. Fuenn, Keneset Yisrael, p. 256), claiming that he was merely a warrior. The credence which he found at the papal court in 1524, the reception accorded to him in 1525 at the Portuguese court (whither he came at the invitation of John III, and where he at first received the promise of help), and the temporary cessation of persecution of the Marrano; all gave the Portuguese and Spanish Marranos reason to believe that Reuveni was a forerunner of the Messiah. Selaya, inquisitor of Badajoz, complained to the King of Portugal that a Jew who had come from the Orient (referring to Reuveni) had filled the Spanish Marranos with the hope that the Messiah would come and lead Israel from all lands back to Israel, and that he had even emboldened them to overt acts (comp. H. Grätz, l.c. ix. 532). Reuveni met Rabbi Solomon Molcho, a former Spanish Christian who had reverted to Judaism. Reuveni and Molcho were arrested in Regensburg on the orders of Charles V, Holy Roman Emperor and king of Spain. He was taken to Mantua, in Italy where, having been baptized a Catholic, he was convicted of heresy and burned at the stake in November, 1532. A spirit of expectancy was aroused by Reuveni's stay in Portugal. In Herrera del Duque, close to Puebla de Alcocer (Badajoz, Extremadura), a Jewish girl of 15 described ecstatic visions in which she spoke with the Messiah, who took her to heaven, where she saw those who had been burned seated on thrones of gold, and who assured her of his imminent return. She (known only as the Maiden of Herrera) was enthusiastically proclaimed a prophetess, and such was the commotion caused by her alleged visions that the Toledo Inquisition had her promptly arrested.

17th century

 Sabbatai Zevi (alternative spellings: Shabbetai, Sabbetai, Shabbesai; Zvi, Tzvi) (b. at Smyrna 1626; d. at Dulcigno (present day Ulcinj) 1676), an Ottoman Jew who claimed to be the Messiah, but then converted to Islam. He still has followers today in the Dönmeh. One of the most important messianic movements, and whose influence was widespread throughout Jewry. His influence is felt even today. After his death, Sabbatai was followed by a line of putative followers who declared themselves Messiahs and are sometimes grouped as the "Sabbethaian Messiahs".
 Barukhia Russo (1695–1740; Osman Baba), successor of Sabbatai Zevi.
 Mordecai Mokia (1650–1729), ("the Rebuker") of Eisenstadt, another follower of Shabbethai who remained faithful to him, Mordecai Mokiaḥ ("the Rebuker") of Eisenstadt, also pretended to be a Messiah. His period of activity was from 1678 to 1682 or 1683. He preached at first that Shabbethai was the true Messiah, that his conversion was for mystic reasons necessary, that he did not die but would reveal himself within three years after his supposed death, and pointed to the persecution of the Jews in Oran (by Spain), in Austria, and in France, and to the pestilence in Germany as prognostications of his coming. He found a following among Hungarian, Moravian, and Bohemian Jews. Going a step further, he declared that he was the Davidic Messiah. Shabbethai, according to him, was only the Ephraitic Messiah and was furthermore rich, and therefore could not accomplish the redemption of Israel. He (Mordecai), being poor, was the real Messiah and at the same time the incarnation of the soul of the Ephraitic Messiah. Italian Jews heard of him and invited him to Italy. He went there about 1680, and received a warm welcome in Reggio and Modena. He spoke of Messianic preparations, which he had to make in Rome, and hinted at having perhaps to adopt Christianity outwardly. Denounced to the Inquisition, or advised to leave Italy, he returned to Bohemia, and then went to Poland, where he is said to have become insane. From his time a sect began to form there, which still existed at the beginning of the Mendelssohnian era.
 Jacob Querido (died 1690), son of Joseph Filosof, and brother of the fourth wife of Sabbatai, became the head of the Shabbethaians in Salonica, being regarded by them as the new incarnation of Shabbethai. He pretended to be Shabbethai's son and adopted the name Jacob Tzvi. With 400 followers converted to Islam about 1687, forming a sect called the Dönmeh. He himself even made a pilgrimage to Mecca (c. 1690). After his death during the pilgrimage his son Berechiah or Berokia succeeded him (c. 1695–1740).
 Miguel (Abraham) Cardoso (1630–1706), born of Marrano parents, may have been initiated into the Shabbethaian movement by Moses Pinheiro in Leghorn. He became a prophet of the Messiah, and when the latter embraced Islam he justified this treason, saying that it was necessary for the Messiah to be reckoned among the sinners in order to atone for Israel's idolatry. He applied Isa. liii. to Shabbethai, and sent out epistles to prove that Shabbethai was the true Messiah, and he even suffered persecution for advocating his cause. Later he considered himself as the Ephraitic Messiah, asserting that he had marks on his body, which were proof of this. He preached and wrote of the speedy coming of the Messiah, fixing different dates until his death (see Cardoso, Miguel).
 Löbele Prossnitz (Joseph ben Jacob) (?–1750), (early 18th century). He taught that God had given dominion of the world to the "pious one," i.e., the one who had entered into the depths of Kabbalah. Such a representative of God had been Shabbethai, whose soul had passed into other "pious" men, into Jonathan Eybeschütz and into himself. Another, Isaiah Hasid (a brother-in-law of the Shabbethaian Judah Hasid), who lived in Mannheim, secretly claimed to be the resurrected Messiah, although publicly he had abjured Shabbethaian beliefs. He was a proven fraud who nevertheless attained some following amongst former followers of Sabbatai, calling himself the "Messiah ben Joseph."

18th century

 Jacob Joseph Frank (born 1726 in Podolia; died 1791), founder of the Frankist movement, also claimed to be the messiah. In his youth he made contact with the Dönmeh. He taught that he was a reincarnation of King David and the Patriarch Joseph. Having secured a following among some Turkish and Wallachian Jews, he came in 1755 to Podolia, where the Shabbethaians were in need of a leader, and revealed himself to them as the reincarnation of the soul of Berechiah. He laid stress on the idea of the "holy king" who was at the same time Messiah, and he accordingly called himself santo señor ("holy lord"). His followers claimed he performed miracles; and they even prayed to him. His purpose, as well as that of his sect, was to uproot rabbinic Judaism. He was forced to leave Podolia; and his followers were persecuted. Returning in 1759, he advised his followers to embrace Christianity, and about 1,000 converted and became Polish gentry of Jewish origins. He himself converted in Warsaw in November 1759. But he ran afoul of the Catholic Church and for a time was imprisoned for heresy. However, even in prison he remained the head of his sect.
 Eve Frank (1754–1816/1817), was the daughter of Jacob Frank. In 1770 Eve was declared to be the incarnation of the Shekinah, the female aspect of God, as well as the reincarnation of the Virgin Mary and thus became the object of a devotional subcult herself in Częstochowa, with some followers keeping small statues of her in their homes. Historian Jerry Rabow sees her as the only woman to have been declared a Jewish messiah.

19th century
 Shukr Kuhayl I, 19th-century Yemenite Messiah candidate.
 Judah ben Shalom (Shukr Kuhayl II), 19th-century Yemenite Messiah candidate.

20th century
 Moses Guibbory (1899–1985), leader of a British Israelite cult in the United States
Menachem Mendel Schneerson (1902–1994), seventh rebbe of Chabad Lubavitch and son-in-law of the sixth; during his lifetime the belief that Schneerson was the messiah received an equivocal response. Following a series of strokes later in his life many of his followers began to openly proclaim him the messiah. In 1993 he openly acknowledged this, including on live television. The number of believers grew in size after his death. Some of his followers believe Schneerson never died. While Schneerson remained cryptic about such assertions, many of his followers do believe he was the messiah.

See also
 Chabad messianism
 Judaism's view of Jesus
 List of messiah claimants
 List of people claimed to be Jesus

References

Bibliography

 Note: For individual figures, please check the relevant entries where specified. This bibliography deals with the general concept and historical research related to Jewish messianism.
 
 Julius Greenstone: The Messianic Idea in Jewish History: Westport: Greenwood: 1972: 
 Harris Lenowitz: Jewish Messiahs: From the Galilee to Crown Heights: New York: Oxford University Press: 1998: 
 Yehuda Liebes: Studies in Jewish Myth and Messianism: Albany: State University of New York Press: 1993: 
 Jacob Neusner, William Scott Green and Ernest Francks (eds.) Judaisms and Their Messiahs at the Turn of the Christian Era: New York: Cambridge University Press: 1987: 
 Raphael Patai: Messiah Texts: Detroit: Wayne State University Press: 1979:  Also: New York: Avon: 1979:

 Jacob Schochet: Mashiach: The Principle of Mashiach in the Messianic Era in Jewish Law and Tradition: New York: SIE: 1992: 
 Gershom Scholem: The Messianic Idea in Judaism: New York: Schocken Books: 1995: 0805210431
 Robert Wolfe: Origins of the Messianic Idea: New York: JREP Print Center: 2003:

External links
 Jewish Encyclopedia: Pseudo-Messiahs

Lists of Jews